Shane Andrew Patton  is an Australian police officer and , the Chief Commissioner of Victoria Police.

Patton grew up in regional Victoria and joined Victoria Police in 1978. Part of his early career was spent at St Kilda Criminal Investigation Branch (CIB) in the 1980s. Other roles have been in general duties, detective work, police prosecutor, ethical standards investigation, transit and education, as well as acting as chief of staff for Simon Overland whilst Overland was Chief Commissioner. Patton was appointed Deputy Commissioner in September 2015 and was made Chief Commissioner on 27June 2020.

In the 2015 Australia Day Honours, Patton was awarded the Australian Police Medal.

References

1960s births
Living people
Chief Commissioners of Victoria Police
Recipients of the Australian Police Medal
People from Victoria (Australia)